Ryan Cousins (born April 1, 1981 in Toronto, Ontario) is a former professional lacrosse player. Cousins played for eleven seasons in the National Lacrosse League, winning a championship in 2012 with the Rochester Knighthawks. He was selected to play in the National Lacrosse League All-Star Game in both 2004 and 2005. Cousins plays for the Victoria Shamrocks of the WLA in the offseason.

Cousins was awarded the National Lacrosse League Defensive Player of the Year Award in both the 2007 and 2008 seasons. During the 2009 NLL season, he was named a reserve to the All-Star game.

In July 2011, Cousins was traded to the Edmonton Rush, along with Aaron Wilson and Kevin Croswell, in exchange for a number of entry draft picks. Three months later, Cousins was traded again, this time to the Rochester Knighthawks. The Rush sent Cousins, Alex Kedoh Hill, and Andy Secore to Rochester for Knighthawks captain Shawn Williams and Aaron Bold.

Cousins suffered a knee injury prior to the 2012 season, and was considering retirement, but was convinced by the Knighthawks to return. Cousins' decision paid off, as the Knighthawks won the 2012 NLL Championship. After suffering another injury prior to the 2013 season, Cousins announced his retirement in February, 2013.

Statistics

NLL

Awards

References

1981 births
Living people
Arizona Sting players
Canadian expatriate lacrosse people in the United States
Canadian lacrosse players
Lacrosse defenders
Lacrosse people from Ontario
Minnesota Swarm players
National Lacrosse League All-Stars
National Lacrosse League major award winners
Rochester Knighthawks players
Sportspeople from Toronto